Cnemidophorus ruatanus is a species of teiid lizard found in Honduras, Guatemala, Nicaragua, and Belize.

References

ruatanus
Reptiles of Belize
Reptiles of Guatemala
Reptiles of Honduras
Reptiles of Nicaragua
Reptiles described in 1928
Taxa named by Thomas Barbour